Balzac v. Porto Rico, 258 U.S. 298 (1922), was a case in which the Supreme Court of the United States held that certain provisions of the U.S. Constitution did not apply to territories not incorporated into the union. It originated when Jesús M. Balzac was prosecuted for criminal libel in a district court of Puerto Rico. Balzac declared that his rights had been violated under the Sixth Amendment to the U.S. Constitution as he was denied a trial by jury since the code of criminal procedure of Puerto Rico did not grant a jury trial in misdemeanor cases. In the appeal, the U.S. Supreme Court affirmed the judgments of the lower courts on the island in deciding that the provisions of the Constitution did not apply to a territory that belonged to the United States but was not incorporated into the Union. It has become known as one of the "Insular Cases".

Background
Jesús Maria Balzac y Balzac edited the newspaper El Baluarte. Balzac wrote an article referring indirectly to the colonial governor at the time, Arthur Yager; the article was considered libelous by the authorities. Pursuant to the Jones Act of 1917, which granted Puerto Ricans American citizenship among other guarantees, Balzac sought jury trial under the Sixth Amendment. In denying the request for jury trial, the Supreme Court of Puerto Rico relied on two 1918 decisions by the United States Supreme Court:  People v. Tapia, and People v. These two per curiam decisions cited the earlier Insular Cases and held that provisions of the Bill of Rights were inapplicable to Puerto Rico even after the passage of the Jones Act.

Decision

The unanimous opinion of the Court was delivered by Chief Justice Taft. He argued that although the Jones Act had granted citizenship to Puerto Ricans, it had not incorporated Puerto Rico into the Union. Although Puerto Rico had been under the control of the United States since the end of the Spanish–American War in 1898, the territory had not been designated for ultimate statehood, and Congress could determine which parts of the Constitution would apply. Taft distinguished Puerto Rico from the territory in the Alaska purchase, acquired from Russia in 1867, which had been held to be incorporated in Rasmussen v. United States. Thus, particular constitutional provisions were applied based on location, rather than on citizenship.

Taft's grounds for denying jury trial specifically echoed earlier Insular Cases reasoning. He argued that because Puerto Rico had been governed by Spanish civil law for four hundred years before American acquisition, the inhabitants would be unprepared for jury service. Taft argued that locals should be able to determine their own laws:

Toward the end of the opinion, the court uses "language that would lead to perpetual litigation in an effort to clarify the rights of the American citizens of Puerto Rico":

The court leaves unresolved the exact "personal rights" that were so "fundamental" that they would extend to American citizens in Puerto Rico.

See also
List of United States Supreme Court cases, volume 258

References

Further reading

External links
 
 

United States Supreme Court cases
United States Supreme Court cases of the Taft Court
Politics of Puerto Rico
United States Sixth Amendment case law
1922 in United States case law
Legal history of Puerto Rico
1922 in Puerto Rico
United States defamation case law